Senator Jensen may refer to:

Carl Jensen (politician) (1920–1988), Minnesota State Senate
Jim Jensen (Nebraska politician) (born 1934), Nebraska State Senate
Phil Jensen (born 1952), South Dakota State Senate
Scott Jensen (Minnesota politician) (born 1954), Minnesota State Senate
Vicki Jensen (born 1965), Minnesota State Senate